The term hermit kingdom is an epithet used to refer to any country, organization or society that willfully walls itself off, either metaphorically or physically, from the rest of the world. North Korea is commonly regarded as a prime example of a hermit kingdom.

The first country to be described as a "hermit kingdom" was Korea during the Joseon dynasty, in William Elliot Griffis's 1882 book Korea: The Hermit Nation. Korea was frequently described as a hermit kingdom until 1905, when it became a protectorate of Japan.

Today, the term is often applied to North Korea in news and social media, and in 2009, it was used by Hillary Clinton, then the United States Secretary of State. Other current countries considered isolationist "hermit kingdoms" include Turkmenistan, Belarus, Eritrea, and the Islamic Emirate of Afghanistan. Historically, the term has been applied to Nepal, Ladakh, and Bhutan in the Himalayas.

During the Cold War, Enver Hoxha's Albania was widely considered a "hermit kingdom" as it was a Stalinist regime, did not allow ordinary citizens out of the country, and was entirely self-sufficient. Unlike North Korea, Hoxha's regime, after the Sino-Albanian split, refused to ally with anyone and was hostile towards the entire world, which made it more isolationist than North Korea, which was then Stalinist but was allied with other Eastern Bloc states and did not become isolationist until after the end of the Cold War.

The term "hermit kingdom" has been used to describe Western Australia when it closed its borders during the COVID pandemic.

See also
Haijin
Sakoku
Kim Il-sung
Isolationism

References 

1880s neologisms
Cultural concepts
Geography
History of Korea
Isolationism